shackspace is  a Stuttgart hackerspace run by shack e.V., a non-profit association, established in 2009. Originally located in North Stuttgart, it moved to Stuttgart-Wangen in March 2011. It is among the largest and fastest-growing hackerspaces in Germany, with over 110 paying members. The mission of shackspace is to foster an environment where people can collaborate on ideas, share knowledge and talents, and explore aspects of life including science, technology, software development, arts and crafts and anything else members express an interest in. shackspace views itself as not only a physical workspace, but also a community of like-minded people.

History 

The idea of a Stuttgart hackerspace was born at the BarCamp Stuttgart in September 2009. In February 2010 a shackspace association was founded, with 23 founding members, who moved to the planned location in North Stuttgart in April 2010. The hackerspace grew rapidly in its first year and moved to a larger facility, located in Stuttgart-Wangen, in March 2011. shackspace is primarily financed through membership dues but has historically accepted public funding and third party sponsorship that have allowed expansion and improvement of rooms, purchase of equipment, and realization of bigger projects.

Membership 

Core members of the group pay monthly dues starting at € 9,60. Non-members are welcome to attend workshops on a variety of subjects, Thunder Talks and other public events as well as take part in different social events such as Plenum and Open House. Visiting beyond this can be arranged on a case by case basis with current members.

Activities & events 

The purpose of shackspace is to increase knowledge and skills related to computer software, hardware and data networks. The association is engaged in numerous activities. For example, the society participated in the Hobby & Elektronik fair in 2010, 2011 and 2014 where they gave workshops, presentations and showcased projects. The shackspace society is also present at events of the Chaos Computer Club, such as the Chaos Communication Congress, Chaos Communication Camp, Gulaschprogrammiernacht (GPN) and many others.

shackspace is also used by other initiatives and groups in and around Stuttgart to host events (tech talks, workshops, project demos, and parties), such as Thunder Talks, Java and Python workshops, public viewing of Google I/O and worldwide HTML5 Campout in collaboration with Google Developer Group Stuttgart, regular meetups of the Linux User Group Stuttgart (LUGS), KDE Code Sprint, NASA International Space Apps Challenge. Any group that identifies themselves with the purpose of the shackspace are also welcome to use the location for meetups and events.

Besides the main purpose of the shackspace association, the members are also engaged in many other activities, for example an urban art workshop, rhetoric workshop, and chemistry experiments. Once a year,an open-house event gives an overview of all activities offered. There is also the regular weekly night social event, Plenum, that provides a good chance to meet people, talk about projects, and take a look around.

Physical space & facilities 

shackspace is currently located at Ulmer Straße 300 in Wangen (Stuttgart). The building was formerly a police station, and the community has done a significant amount of renovation work on it. The current space has several rooms for electronics work, a classroom equipped with a video projector, a lounge area with sofas for laptop work and socializing, and a kitchen.

shackspace offerings include a computer server, machine tools, electronic instrumentation, electronic components, woodworking tools, materials for craft and art, and office supplies.
A complete list of equipment can be found here.

Projects 

shackspace is an incubator for many projects.
 Hackerspace Global Grid, distributed sensor and communication network.
 White Box, electronic and cryptographically sane access control to shackspace without the requirement to hand out physical keys.
 Shackuino, microcontroller board based on the ATMega168.
 Blue Frost, Club-Mate vending machine.
 blinkennerd, blinking LED throwies.
 LED Plasma, 16×16 LED plasma display made from SMD parts.
 Portal, electronic, cryptographic physical access control for shackspace.
 blinken35, implementation of the classic Snake game on a 7x5 pixel LED display.

A complete list of current projects can be found here.

Trivia 

DeimHart recorded an episode of their podcast at shackspace.

shackspace was used as the backdrop and location for a critical interview by TV station SWR on the ELENA system that was going to be implemented in Germany.

Tim Pritlove hosted multiple meetings with his listeners at shackspace.

Radiotux, Binaergewitter, and Retinacast are recording and/or streaming their podcasts from shackspace and are using shackspace (audio-)equipment.

External links 

 
 shackspace Wiki
 shackspace Event Calendar
 shackspace at Hackerspaces.org
 shackspace Trailer (2010)
 shackspace Trailer (2012)
 shackspace at GitHub
 shackspace at Twitter
 shackspace at flickr

References 

Computer clubs in Germany
Hackerspaces
Organisations based in Stuttgart